Yellampalli is a village in Annamayya district of Andhra Pradesh in India. It is located between the towns of Kalikiri and Piler.It is a small village with population of around 100. The village is named after the earlier settlers in the village who belonged to Yellam Reddy subcaste of the Reddy caste. Later a landlord named Kasireddy Rami Reddy moved to the village and built up the basic infrastructure such as houses, canals and roads.

All the people in the village are dependent on agriculture. The main crops include: rice, tomatoes, ground nuts (peanuts) and sugar cane.

The village is in close proximity to reputed schools and colleges. Including Sainik School and JNTU Kalikiri.

Villages in Annamayya district